Josip Bonacin (born 10 February 1984) is a Croatian former footballer who played in the Croatian Second Football League, Croatian First Football League, Liga I, Kazakhstan Premier League, Canadian Soccer League, Premier League of Bosnia and Herzegovina, and First County Football League.

Club career
Josip began his career playing for his home town, NK Solin in the Croatian Second Football League appearing 41 time and scored once for the team. Bonacin has previously played in the Croatian Prva HNL for NK Međimurje and HNK Šibenik. In 2009, he went abroad to Romania to play with FC Unirea Alba Iulia in the Liga I. After one season in Romania he went to Asia to play with FC Zhetysu in the Kazakhstan Premier League.

After being released by FC Zhetysu he left Kazakhstan to attend a trial with the Malaysian Super League champions, Kelantan FA. Josip appeared with Kelantan FA in a friendly match against Indonesian outfit, Pelita Jaya which ended in a 1-1 draw. In 2011, he returned home to play with NK Dugopolje in the 2.HNL. In 2012, he went overseas to Canada to sign with Toronto Croatia in the Canadian Soccer League. He made his debut on 30 September 2012 against Windsor Stars. During his short tenure with Toronto he won the regular season title, and the CSL Championship against Montreal Impact Academy.

He returned to the Balkans in 2013 to play with NK GOŠK Gabela in the Premier League of Bosnia and Herzegovina. In 2015, he returned to Croatia to play with NK Zagora Unešić, and Kastel Gomlica.

References

External links

1984 births
Living people
Association football defenders
Croatian footballers
NK Solin players
NK Međimurje players
HNK Šibenik players
CSM Unirea Alba Iulia players
FC Zhetysu players
NK Dugopolje players
Toronto Croatia players
NK GOŠK Gabela players
NK Zagora Unešić players
Liga I players
Expatriate footballers in Romania
First Football League (Croatia) players
Croatian Football League players
Kazakhstan Premier League players
Canadian Soccer League (1998–present) players
Premier League of Bosnia and Herzegovina players
Croatian expatriate footballers
Croatian expatriate sportspeople in Romania
Expatriate footballers in Kazakhstan
Croatian expatriate sportspeople in Kazakhstan
Expatriate soccer players in Canada
Croatian expatriate sportspeople in Canada
Expatriate footballers in Bosnia and Herzegovina
Croatian expatriate sportspeople in Bosnia and Herzegovina